This article contains information about the literary events and publications of 1573.

Events
Torquato Tasso's pastoral play Aminta is first performed by I Gelosi in palace gardens in Ferrara.

New books

Drama
Anonymous – New Custom (published)
Jean de La Taille – La Famine, ou les Gabéonites
George Gascoigne (published in A Hundred Sundry Flowers)
Jocasta
Supposes
The Montague Masque
Torquato Tasso – Aminta

Poetry
Jean-Antoine de Baïf – Œuvres en rime (Works in verse)
George Gascoigne – A Hundred Sundry Flowers Bound Up in One Small Poesy... (first collected edition of his verse and drama)
See also 1573 in poetry

Births
November 30 – Aubert Miraeus, Netherlandish ecclesiastical historian (died 1640 in literature)
December 21 – Mathurin Régnier, French satirist (died 1613 in literature)
Unknown dates
Severin Binius, German historian (died 1641 in literature)
Daniel Naborowski, Polish poet (died 1640 in literature)
Approximate year of birth – Samuel Rowlands, English prose and verse pamphleteer (died 1630)

Deaths
January 1 – Johann Pfeffinger, German Protestant theologian (born 1493)
February – William Lauder, Scottish poet (born c. 1520)
May 14 (burial) – Richard Grafton, English merchant and printer (born c.1506/7)
July – Étienne Jodelle, French dramatist and poet (born 1532)
October 24 – François Baudouin, French controversialist and historian (born 1520)
November 17 – Juan Ginés de Sepúlveda, Spanish philosopher and theologian (born 1494)
December – Donato Giannotti, Italian political writer, playwright and poet (born 1492)
December 30 – Giovanni Battista Giraldi, Italian novelist and poet (born 1504)
Late – Reginald Wolfe, English printer
Unknown dates
Richard Grafton, English chronicler and King's Printer (born c. 1506–1511)
Paul Skalich, Croatian encyclopedist (born 1534)

References

Years of the 16th century in literature